Bland Hollow is a valley in Stone County in the U.S. state of Missouri.

Bland Hollow has the name of Hiram Bland, a pioneer settler.

References

Valleys of Stone County, Missouri
Valleys of Missouri